Anastasia Vashukevich (born 27 February 1990, Babruysk, Byelorussian SSR), also known as Nastya Rybka, is a Belarusian escort worker and author who claimed to have evidence linking Russian billionaire Oleg Deripaska and Deputy Prime Minister Sergei Prikhodko to Russian interference in the 2016 U.S. presidential election.

Early life and family 
She has no siblings.

She attended night school after being expelled from school in ninth grade. She became pregnant when she was 16. She married her  son's  father and  took his surname [Semenchuk]. She gave  birth  to  their son Yury. while she  attended the university in Belarus Mazyr - later she received a degree in biology. She was 18 when she started a romance on the side and got divorced. She then married Nikolai Vashukevich and again changed her surname [now to  Vashukevich].

US election related photographs, video, and audio recordings
During 2016 to 2017, Vashukevich met with Oleg Deripaska at least three times: during August 2016 on Deripaska's yacht Elden off the coast of Norway with Sergei Prikhodko, during September to October 2016 in southern Russia at Deripaska's mansion, and during January 2017 at Lech, Austria, with United States lobbyist Adam Waldman of the firm Endeavor Group. As of January 2019, Vashukevich has written three books about her relationship with Deripaska: Who Wants to Seduce a Billionaire ( lit. The Billionaire Seduction Diary, or Clone for the Oligarch); Eurotrash, How to Seduce the Rich for the Poor; and a third unpublished book.

Released in September 2017 in collaboration with Alex Lesley, Vashukevich's book Eurotrash, How to Seduce the Rich for the Poor details her trip to Lech, Austria, in early January 2017 with Oleg Deripaska to meet with Adam Waldman, who through Waldman's firm, Endeavor Group, has been a lobbyist for Deripaska since 2009 and for Julian Assange. On 12–13 January 2017, Adam Waldman met with Julian Assange just days after Waldman's Lech, Austria, meeting in a bar at Deripaska's five star Aurelio Hotel with Deripaska and Vashukevich on 7 January 2017. Vashukevich made a video recording with her phone of the 7 January 2017 meeting in the bar.

In her unpublished book, she describes a three-day trip during the fall of 2016 to Deripaska's mansion near Krasnodar where an important-looking man arrived in an all terrain vehicle to discuss issues with Deripaska. Vashukevich recorded these meetings with her phone hidden behind some books.

Vashukevich said that she was close to Oleg Deripaska, a Russian oligarch with ties to Russian President Vladimir Putin and business links to Paul Manafort. She claimed the recorded voices included Deripaska's discussing the 2016 presidential election with other people, including at least three fluent English speakers who she believed were Americans. On 8 February 2018, Alexei Navalny released a video using material obtained by Vashukevich about an August 2016 meeting between Deripaska and Deputy Prime Minister Sergei Prikhodko in which United States and Russia foreign policy was discussed as well as Prikhodko's friend United States diplomat Victoria Nuland and the 2016 United States elections. According to the video, Deripaska served as a liaison between the Russian government and Paul Manafort during Russian interference efforts in United States elections. Navalny correlates Vashukevich's book Who Wants to Seduce a Billionaire to persons, settings, and events in the Vashukevich film. In the video known as Fishgate, Fish Gate or Rybka Gate, Navalny explains the characters and setting for Nastya Rybka's book Who Wants to Seduce a Billionaire: Ruslan Zolotov is Deripaska, Papa is Prikhodko, Vitya or Victor is Yevgeny Agarkov and the Rybka book's setting of Greenland is actually Norway. Rybka refers to Papa as Richelieu, or a Cardinal in the Kremlin who is the person actually responsible for Russia's foreign policy during the governments of Boris Yeltsin, Vladimir Putin, and Dmitri Medvedev. Through Adam Waldman, Deripaska has denied bribery allegations presented in the video.

Deripaska filed a lawsuit in Deripaska's hometown court at Ust-Labinsk, Krasnodar Krai, Russia, against Rybka and Leslie for publishing material about him. On 10 February 2018, Roskomnadzor placed Navalny's website and his investigation video on the prohibited log. On 24 February 2018, Navalny removed his investigation video from his website.

Arrest in Thailand 
On 25 February 2018, Vashukevich was arrested at a hotel in Pattaya, Thailand, and held at Nong Pla Lai Prison. According to Vladimir Sosnov, the head of the consular department of the Russian embassy in Thailand, Rybka was one of ten Russians that were detained and awaiting trial and deportation from Thailand. While in custody, she reached out to the American government seeking asylum in exchange for photographs and 16 hours of audio recordings she made in August 2016, that could shed light on possible Russian interference in American elections. She was visited by FSB, CIA, and many times by Vladimir Pronin, the Russia consul for the Pattaya consular district, but the FBI was not allowed to visit because Thai officials only allowed visitors that were legal representatives for her and her family members. According to Jillian Bonnardeaux spokesperson for the United States embassy in Bangkok, all matters involving asylum are directed to Kirstjen Nielsen and the Department of Homeland Security. Vladimir Pronin gained her release for time served if she left Thailand which she did and, according to court order, returned to Belarus. According to Anti-Corruption Foundation, Deripaska has arranged her imprisonment in Thailand through his agents. Vashukevich believed that Nikolai Patrushev who had traveled to Thailand was involved.

Disruption to Russian websites 
Soon after Vashukevich was arrested, Navalny began posting more of her photographs on his website. The Russian internet agency Roskomnadzor restricted access to Navalny's website, which was on the Telegram network, also blocking as many as 18 million other sites, and triggering anti-censorship demonstrations against Putin.

Relinquishment of recordings, apology 
In August 2018, Vashukevich said she had sent the audio recordings to Deripaska without making them public, hoping he would be able to gain her release from prison. She said she promised Deripaska she would not make any further comment on the recordings' contents. In court, Vashukevich apologized to Deripaska and Prikhodko.

In 2018, Deripaska won a legal case in Deripaska's hometown court at Ust-Labinsk, Krasnodar Krai, Russia, against Vashukevich for the invasion of his privacy by the public availability of videos and photos of the two of them together. Deripaska sued for 1 million rubles from each Vashukevich and Kirillov but the court set the payment at 500,000 rubles for each Vashukevich and Kirillov.

Later arrest and release
Vashukevich was arrested at Sheremetyevo Airport Moscow in January 2019 while in transit from Thailand to Belarus for reportedly drawing people into prostitution. After videos showing her being violently arrested and pleading for her life in court were leaked to the press, Belarusian President Alexander Lukashenko demanded her release. She was immediately released. Vashukevich said she was warned not to discuss Deripaska while in Russian custody. She said her claims about him were intended to save her from death while detained in Thailand.

Later life
Her second marriage was to Nikolai Vashukevich, but she left him and her 11-year-old son Yuri from her  first marriage for Moscow, where  she  earned  her  living  and [according to her] was helping  Nicolai to support her son. Upon her return from Thailand to Moscow in January 2019, Nikolai Vashukevich filmed the extremely rough treatment and arrest of Anastasia Vashukevich by Moscow police at the Sheremetyevo International Airport.

Works
 Rybka, Nastya. Who Wants to Seduce a Billionaire (Дневник соблазнения миллиардера, или клон для олигарха lit. The Billionaire Seduction Diary, or Clone for the Oligarch). Moscow. Eksmo, 2017.  
 Leslie, Alex; Rybka, Nastya. Eurotrash, How to Seduce the Rich for the Poor. Moscow. Eksmo, 2017. First published: September 5, 2017.
 Учебник порядочной рыбы. Настольная книга для взрослых девочек. — Эксмо, 2021. Автор: Настя Рыбка —

Notes

References

Belarusian female models
Escorts
Living people
Prisoners and detainees of Thailand
Prostitution in Belarus
1990 births